Caroline Barker is a British sports journalist and broadcaster who works in television and radio. She currently presents mainly for BBC Radio 5 Live, BBC World Service, Sky Sports, The Totally Football Show and Premier League Productions. Barker was the first female presenter of Match Day Live for Premier League Productions.

Barker first worked for BBC Essex, before joining BBC London 94.9 in 2004 as a sports reporter. While at BBC London she worked as cover for sports reporters on BBC Radio 2 and BBC Radio 4. Beyond sports news, Barker presents the award winning Sportshour for BBC World Service and was presenter of Sportsworld for the BBC World Service until 2015. Since 2014 she has regularly presented on programmes across BBC Radio 5 Live, covering on 5 Live Sport, 5 Live Drive and Weekend Breakfast shows. She has become frequent panellist on BBC 5 Live's sports comedy show Fighting Talk winning the programme's "Rookie of the year award" in May 2015, and in the same year led 5 Live's coverage of the Women's World Cup. She has since hosted the 2019 Women's World Cup for 5 Live. Barker is known for her love of fancy dress and appeared in a parrot costume during a live edition of popular BBC radio 5 show Fighting Talk broadcast from Cardiff.

A fan of her home-town club Chelmsford City, Barker has long been a supporter of non-league football. She is the presenter of The Non-League Football Show, which she created for London 94.9 in 2006, moving with it to 5 Live in 2012. She is a director of The National League and was a founder member of the Non-League Footballers Association and was a director at Chelmsford City from 2009 to 2011. As well as football, Barker is also commentator and analyst on netball, leading BBC coverage of the 2018 Commonwealth Gold winning team and for Sky Sports live coverage of the 2015 Netball World Cup. She is lead commentator for Sky Netball.

In addition to her broadcasting, Barker founded and was director of digital content company JibbaJabba.

Barker has also acted as stand-in host of The Totally Football Show podcast in the absence of regular host, James Richardson, her first appearance being in February 2018. She now hosts The Totally Football League Show and football coverage for Sky Sports

She hosted the 2018 Champions League of Darts and 2019 Champions League of Darts on the BBC alongside Mark Webster (darts player) and Paul Nicholson (darts player). She also covers the NFL International Series for BBC Sport, but has yet to grasp the geographical location of one of the 2023 Superbowl teams. Much to the ire of UK NFL fans, Barker refers to the Kansas City Chiefs (who are based in the state of Missouri)  as the bordering state of 'Kansas'.

References

British journalists
1979 births
Living people
People from Chelmsford
BBC sports presenters and reporters
BBC Radio 5 Live presenters
Netball commentators
Chelmsford City F.C. non-playing staff